Wilde Harten  is a 1989 Dutch film directed by Jindra Markus.  It was based on his own story.  The film was distributed internationally under the title Wild Hearts.

Cast
 Alexandra van Marken ...  Alison 
 Han Oldigs ...  Quinten 
 Herbert Flack ...  Martin 
 Wim van Rooij ...  Primo 
 Frank Schaafsma ...  Tommie 
 Joop Doderer ...  Ormas 
 Andrea Domburg ...  Dora 
 Tom de Ket ...  Accomplice 
 Yorick van Wageningen ...  Accomplice 
 Dries Smits ...  Cabaret Singer 
 René van Asten ...  Cabaret Singer 
 Fred Florusse ...  Cabaret Singer
 Hein Boele ...  Choreographer 
 Tingue Dongelmans ...  Nurse 
 Ronald Beer ...  Arts

External links 
 

Dutch crime drama films
1989 films
1980s Dutch-language films